The African People's Bloc (BPA) was a political party in French Dahomey.

History
The party was established in 1946 by Justin Ahomadégbé-Tomêtin and Émile Poisson due to their dissatisfaction with the policies of the Dahomeyan Progressive Union (UPD). In the 1946–47 General Council elections the party won 6 of the 30 seats, finishing second to the Dahomeyan Progressive Union; Ahomadégbé-Tomêtin and Poisson were both elected. The party failed to win a seat in the French National Assembly in the 1951 elections, but won four seats in the 1952 Territorial Assembly elections. 

In 1955 the party merged with the UPD to form the Dahomeyan Democratic Union.

References

Defunct political parties in Benin
Political parties established in 1946
Political parties disestablished in 1955